Fred Barrett (1920–2004) was an Irish professional rugby league footballer who played in the 1940s and 1950s, and coached in the 1950s.

Playing career
Barrett first appeared for Keighley at the start of the 1940–41 season and remained with the club until the end of the 1951–52 season.  During that period he made 296 appearances for the club and scored 45 tries and kicked one goal.  In his last playing season he captained the team and was the captain in Keighley's only peacetime Yorkshire Cup final as they lost 17–3 to Wakefield Trinity.  Barrett predominantly played as a centre or halfback but as one of his teammates recalled, "During his career he played in every position except hooker".

Coaching
After retiring from playing Barrett coached the club's A team before becoming first team coach at the end of the 1950s.

References

1920 births
2004 deaths
Irish rugby league players
Keighley Cougars captains
Keighley Cougars coaches
Keighley Cougars players
Rugby league halfbacks
Rugby league centres